Epoicotheriidae ("strange beasts") is an extinct family of  insectivorous mammals which were endemic to North America from the early Eocene to the early Oligocene 55.8—30.9 Ma existing for approximately . Epoicotheriids were highly specialized animals that were convergent with the golden moles of Africa in the structure of their skulls and forelimbs, and would have had a similar lifestyle as subterranean burrowers.

Classification and phylogeny

Taxonomy
Epoicotheriidae was named by Simpson in 1927. It was assigned to the Palaeanodonta by Rose (1978) and Carroll (1988).

Classification
 Family: †Epoicotheriidae (Simpson, 1927)
 Genus: †Alocodontulum (Rose, 1978)
 †Alocodontulum atopum (Rose, 1977)
 Genus: †Auroratherium (Tong & Wang, 1997)
 †Auroratherium sinense (Tong & Wang, 1997)
 Genus: †Dipassalus (Rose, 1991)
 †Dipassalus oryctes (Rose, 1991)
 Genus: †Pentapassalus (Gazin, 1952)
 †Pentapassalus pearcei (Gazin, 1952)
 †Pentapassalus woodi (Guthrie, 1967)
 Genus: †Tubulodon (Jepsen, 1932)
 †Tubulodon taylori (Jepsen, 1932)
 Subfamily: †Epoicotheriinae (Simpson, 1927)
 Genus: †Epoicotherium (Simpson, 1927)
 †Epoicotherium unicum (Douglass, 1905)
 Genus: †Molaetherium (Storch & Rummel, 1999)
 †Molaetherium heissigi (Storch & Rummel, 1999)
 Genus: †Tetrapassalus (Simpson, 1959)
 †Tetrapassalus mckennai (Simpson, 1959)
 †Tetrapassalus proius (West, 1973)
 Genus: †Xenocranium (Colbert, 1942)
 †Xenocranium pileorivale (Colbert, 1942)

Phylogenetic tree
The phylogenetic relationships of Epoicotheriidae are shown in the following cladogram:

References

Palaeanodonta
Eocene mammals
Eocene first appearances
Prehistoric mammals of North America
Myrmecophagous mammals
Eocene extinctions
Prehistoric mammal families